Mangupura is the capital of Badung Regency, Bali, Indonesia. The city has been the capital of Badung Regency since the enactment of Regulation Number 67, of 16 November 2009. Previously, the capital was located in Denpasar.

Mangupura specifically developed as an urban area complete with the infrastructure and public service standards of urban areas. Mangupura region includes 9 town in Mengwi.

Etymology
The name Mangupura is a portmanteau of two words, mangu (from Old Javanese mango, lango, langu, and langen, all of which mean the feeling of being captivated or allured by beauty or everything wonderful in general), and pura (from a Sanskrit word pur, which means a town, castle, or fortified city). Thus, the name Mangupura implies that it is a captivating city, a place to find beauty, peace and happiness, a city that brings prosperity to its people, and the capital that fosters a sense of security for the people.

References

Populated places in Bali
Regency seats of Bali
Badung Regency